Allosiopelus punctatipennis is a species of beetle in the family Carabidae, the only species in the genus Allosiopelus.

References

Harpalinae